Nationalism and After is a 1945 work by E.H. Carr. The book compares the nationalist movements of the nineteenth century with those of the twentieth.

References

Works by E. H. Carr
1945 non-fiction books
Macmillan Publishers books